Doug “Cookie" Cook ( July 27, 1932  – June 16, 1999 ) was an American drag racer. 

Cook started in gassers, with a win in C/G at Detroit Dragway  in Detroit, Michigan, in 1959.

He took a win in C/GS at Detroit Dragway in 1960, in a Chevrolet-powered 1941 Willys gasser. Because this was a C/GS class win, this was not, strictly, a repeat win.

In 1962, driving the Stone-Woods-Cook Oldsmobile-powered 1941 Willys gasser, Cook won A/GS at the NHRA Nationals at Indianapolis Raceway Park in Indianapolis, Indiana.

At the 1965 NHRA Nationals, held at Indianapolis Raceway Park, 1941 Willyses driven by (the Stone-Woods-Cook gasser, sponsored by Isky Cams, now powered by a Chrysler hemi) and Dick Bourgeois (owned by "Big John" Mazmanian, sponsored by Engle Cams) faced off in A/GS.

Fred Stone, Leonard Woods Jr. and Doug “Cookie” Cook had a car that dominated the NHRA “Gasser Wars” in the 1960s. Cook drove to over 400 drag race victories in the famed Stone, Woods & Cook 41 Willys Coupe cars.

What was especially noteworthy about the team was Cook was Caucasian, and Stone and Woods were African-American. Their partnership is considered the first competitive multiracial team in drag racing.

Cook also drove the Stone-Woods-Cook  AA/GS 1966 Mustang Dark Horse Too.

Stone-Woods-Cook abandoned A/GS for Top Fuel Funny Car by the start of the 1967 season.

Notes

Sources
Taylor, Thom.  "Gone Gassers" in Hot Rod, March 2017, p. 9.
Davis, Larry. Gasser Wars, North Branch, MN:  Cartech, 2003, pp. 181, 182, 184, & 187.
CompetitionPlus, Drag Racing's Internet Magazine

Dragster drivers
American racing drivers